The Conservative Mennonite Conference (CMC) is a Christian body of Mennonite churches in the Anabaptist tradition. Its members are mostly of Amish descent.

Despite its name, the Conservative Mennonite Conference is not generally considered to align with Conservative Mennonite practice, but rather, is mainline in orientation.

History 

For the early history see Anabaptism#History.

Amish Beginnings 

The first American settlement of the Amish Mennonites — who in 1693 separated from the main body of Swiss Brethren and followed Jacob Amman — was in Berks County, Pennsylvania, around 1710–1720. Soon they had settlements in Chester and Lancaster counties as well. By the middle of the 19th century, they had congregations from Pennsylvania to Iowa, as well as in Ontario, Canada.

The major division among the Amish 

Before the division all factions of the Amish were either called Amish or Amish Mennonites, with no difference in meaning. Mostly in the years between 1862 and 1878 a major division occurred among the Amish, that eventually led to two major factions: The Amish Mennonites and Old Order Amish.

Some of the more liberal minded Amish ministers organized conferences to serve their churches between 1862 and 1878. After the 1878 conference, they became known as the Amish Mennonites and their ministers formed three district conferences: Eastern, Indiana-Michigan, and Western.

Other congregations remained aloof from this conference movement and became forerunners of two groups — the Old Order Amish that formed mostly in the last third of the 19th century and the Conservative (Amish) Mennonite Conference that formed in 1910. Most of the churches of the liberal minded Amish Mennonite conference movement eventually merged with other Mennonite groups.

The Old Order Amish continued to worship in private homes (in the German language) and reject innovations in both worship and lifestyle. Some congregations were theologically in between the extremely conservative Old Order Amish and the more progressive conference Amish Mennonites. These churches did not join the Amish Mennonite conferences, but, unlike the Old Order Amish, were open to the use of meetinghouses, and the organization of missionary, publication, social service, and Sunday school work. Representatives of these congregations met in a conference in Pigeon, Michigan, on November 24–25, 1910, and adopted the name Conservative Amish Mennonite Conference. "Amish" was dropped and the current name taken when a revised constitution was adopted in 1957.

Later developments 

Concern by some members and churches within the conference over liberalizing tendencies caused a number of congregations and individuals of the Conservative Mennonite Conference to splinter or move away from this group to join other more conservative Mennonites. The earliest group began to be associated informally together in what was called the Conservative Mennonite Fellowship beginning in 1956 with churches in Ontario, Ohio and elsewhere. In 1998, a group of leaders in the Conservative Mennonite Conference, disagreeing with a vote by the conference ministers that resulted in the wives of ministers no longer being required to wear the prayer veiling, left the conference and formed the Biblical Mennonite Alliance.

Faith and practice
The Conservative Mennonite Conference subscribes to the "Mennonite Confession of Faith of 1963", and adopted a "Conservative Mennonite Statement of Theology" in 1991. The statement follows orthodox Trinitarian Christian patterns of belief with typical Mennonite emphasis. Baptism is a church ordinance, which may be performed by either pouring or immersion. Communion and feet washing are also observed. The statement also affirms the traditional Anabaptist position of nonresistance toward enemies: "Under God's provision, the state uses the sword, which 'is ordained of God outside the perfection of Christ' and is a function contrary to the New Testament teachings for the church and the disciple of Christ."

According to their mission statement: "The Conservative Mennonite Conference exists to glorify God by equipping leaders and congregations for worship, teaching, fellowship, service, and making disciples by providing resources and conference structures with an evangelical, Anabaptist, and conservative theological orientation." The sociologist Cory Anderson writes that despite its name, the Conservative Mennonite Conference is not categorized as a Conservative Mennonite denomination, but rather, is mainline in orientation.

Women may engage in ministry, but leadership and ordination is restricted to men. Two meetings are held annually, one in February for the ministers, and another in August for the general public. The executive board and the general secretary are elected at the ministers' meeting to oversee day-to-day operations.

Status
The Conservative Mennonite Conference is a North American body. In 2005 the conference had 11,199 members in 113 congregations in the United States. There was one congregation in Red Lake, Ontario, Canada. There are related bodies in other nations, such as the Costa Rica Mennonite Conference (org. 1974) and the Nicaragua Mennonite Conference (org. 1977).

The Brotherhood Beacon, the conference's official monthly periodical, began in 1971. Before this the conference published the Herold der Wahrheit, a semi-monthly publication, starting in 1912, and later the Missionary Bulletin, a quarterly, starting in 1952.

The Conservative Mennonite Conference has a number of parachurch ministries.  Rosedale Bible College is an accredited, two-year Bible college serving approximately 125 students annually.  The college offers degrees in Biblical Studies with a number of additional concentration areas. Rosedale International, formerly Rosedale Mennonite Missions until 2019, is the mission agency of the conference, with roughly 120 workers in some 17 countries.  Choice Books of Great Lakes-Rosedale operates under the supervision of Rosedale International. It is a vendor of inspirational, wholesome and family-oriented reading materials operating through a network of independent regional distributors working cooperatively with a central office located in Harrisonburg, Virginia. The conference headquarters, Rosedale Bible College, and Choice Books' distribution center, are all located in Rosedale, Ohio, a rural crossroads about 30 miles west of Columbus, Ohio. The offices of Rosedale International were also located in Rosedale until 2015 when they were moved into Columbus proper. 

The Conservative Mennonite Conference maintains a loose relationship with the Mennonite Church USA (the largest Mennonite denomination), through representation on some of its major boards.

Further reading
Encyclopedia of American Religions, J. Gordon Melton, editor
Handbook of Denominations in the United States, by Frank S. Mead, Samuel S. Hill, and Craig D. Atwood
History of the Conservative Mennonite Conference (1985), by Ivan J. Miller, 
Mennonite Encyclopedia (Vol. 5), Cornelius J. Dyck, Dennis D. Martin, et al., editors
Religious Congregations & Membership in the United States (2000), Glenmary Research Center

References

External links
The Brotherhood Beacon - Official periodical
Choice Books of Great Lakes-Rosedale
Conservative Mennonite Conference - official Web Site
Conservative Mennonite Statement of Theology
Rosedale International
 Conservative Mennonite Conference at Global Anabaptist Mennonite Encyclopedia Online

Mennonitism in Canada
Mennonitism in the United States
Conservative Mennonites
Evangelical denominations in North America
Christian organizations established in 1910
1910 establishments in Michigan